General Sir Charles Bonham-Carter,  (25 February 1876 – 21 October 1955) was a British Army officer and later Governor of Malta.

Early life
Bonham-Carter was born on 25 February 1876 in Kensington, London, the ninth of eleven children of Henry and Sibella Charlotte Bonham-Carter. His father was a director of an insurance company. He was educated at Clifton College near Bristol and then the Royal Military College, Sandhurst.

Military career
Bonham-Carter was commissioned into the British Army as a second lieutenant in the Queen's Own Royal West Kent Regiment on 29 February 1896, and was promoted to a lieutenant on 16 July 1898. Serving in the 2nd Battalion of his regiment, he was in early 1900 posted to South Africa for active service in the Second Boer War. Together with 1030 officers and men of the battalion, he left Southampton on the SS Bavarian in March 1900, and on arriving in South Africa was part of the 17th Brigade, 8th Division. The battalion stayed there until after the end of the war in 1902, and then was posted to Ceylon.

He went to the British Army Staff College in Camberley and joined the British Expeditionary Force (BEF) to France as a regimental officer. He held a number of staff posts in France and between 1917 and 1918 he was Brigadier General Staff (Training) at the General Headquarters, despite opposition he started programmes to train the men in general and vocational subjects. He was awarded the Distinguished Service Order and the American Distinguished Service Medal for his work and was mentioned in dispatches five times.

After the First World War Bonham-Carter served in Turkey and India, and in 1927 became Director of Staff Duties. In 1931 he moved to become General Officer Commanding the 4th Division in Colchester. In 1933 he was promoted to Lieutenant-General and became Director-General of the Territorial Army until 1936.

Malta
In 1936 Bonham-Carter was appointed Governor and Commander in Chief of Malta following the death of General Sir David Campbell. It was a time of political unrest on the island and a constitutional body was formed to find a more representative form of self-government, the earlier constitution having been suspended. The subsequent changes overseen by Bonham-Carter was to create something more representative and acceptable to the population. Although a strong supporter of the need to defend the islands after war was declared in 1939, by October 1940 he had become ill and had to resign his post, effective 11 October 1940.

He was appointed Colonel of The Queen's Own Royal West Kent Regiment in 1936, a post he held until 1946.

Retirement
Bonham-Carter took a number of posts in retirement including chairman of the Royal School, Bath, chairman of the Royal School for Soldier's Daughters in Hampstead. He was also a governor of his old school Clifton College. He died at home in Petersfield, Hampshire, on 21 October 1955.

Family
Bonham-Carter married first, at Drogheda on 22 February 1902, Gladys Beryl Coddington, daughter of Colonel Arthur Blayney Coddington, and they had two sons. Following a divorce in 1909 he married Gabrielle Madge Jeanette Fisher in 1911 and they had a son, Victor Bonham-Carter. His brothers included Sir Edgar Bonham Carter and Sir Maurice Bonham Carter, the latter of whom is the grandfather of actress Helena Bonham Carter.

Honours
1917 – Distinguished Service Order
14 July 1917  – Brevet Colonel Charles Bonham-Carter, DSO, Royal West Kent Regiment given permission to wear the Croix d'Officer of Légion d'honneur awarded by the President of the French Republic for distinguished service rendered during the course of the campaign.
1919 – Companions of the Order of St Michael and St George
12 July 1919 – Brevet Colonel (temporary Brigadier-General) Charles Bonham-Carter, CMG, DSO, Royal West Kent Regiment is given permission to wear the American Distinguished Service Medal awarded by the President of the United States for distinguished service rendered during the course of the campaign.
 1941 – Knight Grand Cross of the Order of the Bath

Memorial
There is a memorial to him in St Mary's Church, Buriton.

References

External links 
The Papers of General Sir Charles Bonham-Carter held at Churchill Archives Centre
Generals of World War II

|-

1876 births
1955 deaths
Charles
British Army generals of World War II
British Army generals of World War I
Companions of the Distinguished Service Order
Companions of the Order of St Michael and St George
Foreign recipients of the Distinguished Service Medal (United States)
Governors and Governors-General of Malta
Graduates of the Royal Military College, Sandhurst
Graduates of the Staff College, Camberley
Knights Grand Cross of the Order of the Bath
Officiers of the Légion d'honneur
People educated at Clifton College
People from Kensington
Queen's Own Royal West Kent Regiment officers
People from Buriton
Recipients of the Distinguished Service Medal (US Army)
Military personnel from London